Piernicola Pedicini (born 22 May 1969 in Benevento) is an Italian politician and member of the European Parliament since 2014. In December 2020, he joined the Greens/EFA group together with his colleagues Rosa D'Amato, Eleonora Evi and Eleonora Evi.

In addition to his committee assignments, Pedicini is a member of the MEPs Against Cancer group.

References

Living people
MEPs for Italy 2014–2019
MEPs for Italy 2019–2024
Five Star Movement MEPs
Five Star Movement politicians
People from Benevento
1969 births